Trestieni may refer to several villages in Romania:

 Trestieni, a village in Pârscov Commune, Buzău County
 Trestieni, a village in Ulmi Commune, Giurgiu County
 Trestieni, a village in Tâmboești Commune, Vrancea County
 Trestienii de Jos and Trestienii de Sus, villages in Dumbrava Commune, Prahova County

and a village in Moldova:
 Trestieni, a village in Colicăuți Commune, Briceni district
 Valea-Trestieni, a commune in Nisporeni district